The Voyage  (Italian: Il viaggio) is a 1921 Italian silent drama film directed by Gennaro Righelli and starring Maria Jacobini and Carlo Benetti. It is an adaptation of the novel of the same title by Luigi Pirandello. It was made by the Turin-based Fert Film.

Cast
 Carlo Benetti
 Alfonso Cassini
 Maria Jacobini
 Andrea Rinaldi

References

Bibliography
 Mancini, Elaine. Struggles of the Italian Film Industry During Fascism, 1930-1935. UMI Research Press, 1985.

External links

1921 films
1920s Italian-language films
Films based on works by Luigi Pirandello
Films directed by Gennaro Righelli
Italian silent feature films
Italian black-and-white films
Italian drama films
1921 drama films
Silent drama films
1920s Italian films